Maurice Bouilloux-Lafont (10 April 1875 – 29 July 1937) was a minister of state for Monaco. He served between June 1932 and June 1937.

Literature 
 Jean-Rémy Bézias: La France et l'intégration internationale de la principauté de Monaco (1918-1939), in: Guerres mondiales et conflits contemporains, No. 221 (January 2006), pp. 93–103. Available here.

References

Ministers of State of Monaco
1937 deaths
1875 births